William Marlowe (25 July 1930 – 31 January 2003) was a British theatre, television and film actor.

He served in the Fleet Air Arm and hoped for a career as a writer before training as an actor at RADA. He was cast in A Family at War (1970–72), as Harry Mailer in the Doctor Who serial The Mind of Evil (1971), as Sir Guy of Gisbourne in The Legend of Robin Hood (1975), as Brian Kettle in Rooms (1977), and as DCI Bill Russell in The Gentle Touch (1980–84).

He appeared twice in Doctor Who (as Mailer in The Mind of Evil (1971) and as Lester in Revenge of the Cybermen (1975). His guest star roles include Special Branch (1974), Barlow (1975), Breakaway (1980), Callan (1972) and Catch Hand (1964). Later he played Chief Supt. Thomas in The Chief (1990).

He was married to actress Linda Marlowe (née Bathurst) from 1958 until 1967, to actress Catherine Schell from 1968 until 1977, and to Kismet Delgado (née Shahani), the widow of actor Roger Delgado, from 1983 until his death in 2003, aged 72.

Filmography

References

External links
 

1930 births
2003 deaths
Male actors from London
British male film actors
British male stage actors
British male television actors
Alumni of RADA